, or the "generation of 66", refers to hopes within Indonesia for a generation of young leaders and a new intellectual life following the Fall of Sukarno and the establishment of Suharto's New Order in the mid-1960s.

The New Order had begun with much popular support and high hopes that the troubles of Sukarno's era were over. Within a few years, however, the New Order elite, with the military and a small civilian faction at its centre, had alienated many original allies.

References
 Ricklefs, M.C. 1991. A History of Modern Indonesia since c.1300. 2nd Edition, p. 284, Stanford: Stanford University Press. 

New Order (Indonesia)
Suharto
Transition to the New Order